Horseshoe Valley may refer to:

 Horseshoe Valley (Antarctica)
 Horseshoe Valley (Peleliu)
 Horseshoe Valley (Missouri)
 Horseshoe Valley (North Dakota)
 Horseshoe Valley (Nebraska)
 Horseshoe Valley, North Dakota
 Horseshoe Resort, formerly Horseshoe Valley Ski Club, in southern Ontario, Canada